Brenda Hanney (born 1987) is a camogie player, a member of the Galway senior panel that unsuccessfully contested the All Ireland finals of 2010 and 2011 against Wexford, captain of the 2011 All Ireland runners-up and scorer of the winning goal in the 2011 All Ireland semi-final against Kilkenny.

Other awards
All Ireland Club Championship 2011, National Camogie League 2005, All Ireland Intermediate 2004, Junior National Camogie League 2001, All Ireland Junior Championship 2003, Ashbourne Shield with Cork IT 2006.

References

External links
 Camogie.ie Official Camogie Association Website

1987 births
Living people
Galway camogie players